Dragan Žarković (born 16 April 1986) is a Serbian football defender.

Youth years
Born in Belgrade, SR Serbia, Žarković started playing and have spent 10 years in youth ranks of in his hometown club FK Obilić.

Senior career
He turned professional in Obilić, but has gained first experience in Mladi Obilić, playing in third rank of Serbian football. Next year Žarković has spent in another Belgrade based 3rd league club Grafičar, where he has attracted attention to newly promoted second league club BSK Borča. With BSK, he has earned promotion to Serbian major league in 2010. In season 2011–12 he played in Shahrdari Tabriz in Azadegan League. After one year abroad, his new destination was his homeland; after two matches for FK Hajduk Kula he went on to Novi Pazar. After parting with Novi Pazar, Žarković has wore jersey of Târgu Mureș in second league of Romania for six months.

On 28 June 2019, Žarković returned to Cypriot club Ermis Aradippou FC. However, he was released on 12 November 2019 due to personal reasons.

References

External links
 Dragan Žarković Stats and bio at Utakmica.rs
 

1986 births
Living people
Footballers from Belgrade
Serbian footballers
Association football defenders
FK BSK Borča players
Serbian SuperLiga players
FK Mladi Obilić players
Shahrdari Tabriz players
FK Hajduk Kula players
FK Novi Pazar players
FK Napredak Kruševac players
FK Radnik Surdulica players
ASA 2013 Târgu Mureș players
Ermis Aradippou FC players
Nea Salamis Famagusta FC players
Cypriot First Division players
OFK Bačka players
Serbian expatriate footballers
Expatriate footballers in Iran
Expatriate footballers in Romania
Expatriate footballers in Cyprus
Serbian expatriate sportspeople in Iran
Serbian expatriate sportspeople in Romania
Serbian expatriate sportspeople in Cyprus